In chemistry, a precursor is a compound that contributes in a chemical reaction and produces another compound, or a chemical substance that gives rise to another more significant chemical product. Since several years metal-organic compounds are widely used as molecular precursors for the chemical vapor deposition process (MOCVD). The success of this method is mainly due to its adaptability and to the increasing interest for the low temperature deposition processes. Correlatively, the increasing demand of various thin film materials for new industrial applications is also a significant reason for the rapid development of MOCVD. Certainly, a wide variety of materials which could not be deposited by the conventional halide CVD process, because halide reactive do not exist or are not volatile, can now be grown by MOCVD. This includes metals and different multi-component materials such as semiconductor and intermetallic compounds as well as carbides, nitrides, oxides, borides, silicides and chalcogenides. Further significant advantages of MOCVD over physical processes are a capability for large scale production, an easier automation, a good conformal coverage, the selectivity and the ability to produce metastable materials.

Thus, much effort has been aimed at the synthesis of new molecular precursors. A productive overview is provided by several exceptional reviews covering fields of MOCVD such as, for instance, epitaxial growth of semiconductor compounds, and low temperature deposition of metals. An overview of metal-organic compounds used for the MOCVD growth of different kind of materials is reported in the following  reviews.
This is a list of prominent precursor complexes synthesized thus far with suited properties to be utilized for MOCVD processes.

List

References

Chemical vapour deposition precursors